Louis Audran, the fourth and youngest son of Germain Audran, was born at Lyon in 1670, and instructed in engraving by his uncle Gérard. He did not execute many plates, but assisted his brothers in forwarding theirs. He died at Paris about 1712. He engraved some copies of the large plates executed by his relatives. There is a set of seven middle-sized plates by him of the 'Seven Acts of Mercy,' after Bourdon. He also engraved after the works of Le Brun, Poussin, and other French painters.

References
 

1670 births
1710s deaths
Engravers from Lyon
17th-century French engravers
18th-century French engravers